The 2023 Brasil Tennis Challenger was a professional tennis tournament played on clay courts. It was the first edition of the tournament which was part of the 2023 ATP Challenger Tour. It took place in Piracicaba, Brazil between 16 and 22 January 2023.

Singles main-draw entrants

Seeds

 1 Rankings are as of 9 January 2023.

Other entrants
The following players received wildcards into the singles main draw:
  Pedro Boscardin Dias
  João Lucas Reis da Silva
  Eduardo Ribeiro

The following players received entry into the singles main draw as alternates:
  Térence Atmane
  Daniel Dutra da Silva

The following players received entry from the qualifying draw:
  Andrey Chepelev
  Chung Yun-seong
  Murkel Dellien
  Edoardo Lavagno
  Oleg Prihodko
  Thiago Seyboth Wild

The following players received entry as lucky losers:
  Moez Echargui
  Carlos Sánchez Jover

Champions

Singles

 Andrea Collarini def.  Tomás Barrios Vera 6–2, 7–6(7–1).

Doubles

 Orlando Luz /  Marcelo Zormann def.  Andrea Collarini /  Renzo Olivo Walkover.

References

2023 ATP Challenger Tour
2023 in Brazilian sport
January 2023 sports events in Brazil